The 2000 AFL finals series took place between 11 August and 2 September in the 2000 AFL season. The eight clubs which participated were competing for the Australian Football League premiership. The Essendon Football Club would go through the series undefeated and claim their 16th premiership.

Overview

Week One

Elimination finals

Qualifying finals

Week Two

Semi-finals

Week Three

Preliminary finals

Week Four

Grand final

References
AFL Tables: 2000 Finals Results

2000 in Australian rules football
Finals Series